Orog Lake, or Orog Nuur is a lake located in the district of Bogd, in Bayankhongor Province, Mongolia.

It is situated at an altitude of 1216 m above sea level. Fed by the waters of the river Tüyn Gol. The shores are low and sandy, with salt marshes in some places. Fresh or salt water predominates depending on the amount of rainfall. Frozen from November to April. It is rich in fish and waterfowl.

References

Lakes of Mongolia
Bayankhongor Province